Superstar (in Persian: سوپر استار) is an Iranian film directed and written by Tahmineh Milani, produced in 2008 in Iran.

Plot
A spoiled Iranian screen idol Kourosh Zand (Shahab Hosseini) meets Raha Azimi (Fataneh Malek-Mohammadi), a teenage girl who claims to be his daughter. She moves in with Zand and disrupts his privileged lifestyle.

Cast
 Shahab Hosseini - Kourosh Zand
 Nasrin Moghanloo - Shahla
 Fataneh Malek Mohammadi - Raha Azimi
 Sara Khoeiniha - Director's wife
 Elsa Firouz Azar - Sarah
 Reza Rashidpour - Kourosh' colleague
 Mohammad Reza Sharifinia - Director
 Narges Mohammadi - Stage Secretary
 Fariba Kosari - Mother of Kourosh
 Leila Zare
 Afsaneh Bayegan

Reception
Reviewers have compared Superstar unfavourably to Milani's previous films, with Chicago Reader reviewer J R Jones stating "Milani is best known for films exposing the plight of women in the Islamic republic [...] Any such themes are downplayed in this sentimental story", and in the Los Angeles Times, Gary Goldstein says that "Tahmineh Milani is considered one of Iran's most accomplished filmmakers, but you wouldn't necessarily glean that from her disappointing drama: Superstar".

However, LA Weekly reviewer Tim Grierson notes that "at least Superstar exhibits a tender, intelligent sweetness, which helps to temper the utter conventionality and more melodramatic moments".

Awards and Nominees

External links
 
 Iranian Movie DataBase فیلم سوپراستار عنوان تصحیح شده توسط ربات

References

Iranian drama films
2009 films